The Executive Council of Maine was a government body established with the Maine Constitution in 1820 and dissolved via statewide referendum in 1975. It was made up of seven members, traditionally defeated members of the majority legislative party, and was used as a safeguard against gubernatorial control. However, the unelected council often had problems with governors from different political parties. In the last years of the Executive Council, the Republican majority council and legislature faced serious opposition from Democrat Kenneth M. Curtis. In November 1975, the body was disestablished via a statewide referendum. Said then former Governor Curtis on news of abolishment, "I didn't think I'd live long enough to see it (abolition) happen".

Prominent members
 John Fremont Hill, Governor of Maine
 Stephen Lindsey, President of the Maine Senate and US Congressman
 Joshua Gage, US Congressman
 John Hodgdon, President of the Maine Senate
 Levi Hubbard, US Congressman

References

1820 establishments in Maine
1975 disestablishments in Maine
Government of Maine
State executive councils of the United States